The Blue Umbrella is a 1980 Indian novel written by Ruskin Bond. It was adapted into 2005 Hindi film by the same name, directed by Vishal Bhardwaj, which later won the National Film Award for Best Children's Film. In 2012, the novel was adapted into a comic by Amar Chitra Katha publications, titled, The Blue Umbrella – Stories by Ruskin Bond, and included another story, Angry River. This story appeared in Bond's collection of short stories, Children's Omnibus.

Summary 

In the village of Garhwal lives a girl named Binya. She lives with her widow mother and her older brother

In the village, Ram Bharosa keeps an old shop and sells Coca-Cola with no ice, tea, curd and sweets. One day, Binya receives a beautiful blue umbrella by some foreigners in exchange for her leopard claw pendant. Soon, the shopkeeper becomes jealous of the umbrella and tries to buy it from Binya by claiming, "This is a fancy umbrella which small girls should not have", but Binya refuses. As time passes, Ram Bharosa's jealousy of the umbrella turns into an obsession. He employs a boy named Rajaram from the next village to work at the shop. When Rajaram learns of his boss' desire to own the umbrella, he makes an attempt to steal it but fails and is caught. Rajaram then gives up Ram Bharosa's name, causing his shop to be boycotted. Ram Bharosa is now remorseful of his actions and miserable. Binya realizes her showing off the blue umbrella indirectly led to Ram Bharosa's suffering. In the end, Binya willingly gives the umbrella to Ram Bharosa, who in turn gifts her a bear claw pendant..

References 

Indian children's novels
Indian novels adapted into films
Novels set in India
1980 novels
Novels adapted into comics
1980 children's books
1980 Indian novels
Works by Ruskin Bond